Infektio is the thirty-fifth album by Finnish experimental rock band Circle. It was released in April 2011 on CD and limited vinyl.

Track listing
A1 Salvos (15:10)
A2 Maatunut (6:20)
B1 Peruuttamaton (7:57)
B2 Pisara (5:38)
B3 Saarnaaja (3:46)
B4 Kalpea (2:57)

Personnel
Janne Westerlund
Jussi Lehtisalo
Tomi Leppänen
Mika Rättö
Julius Jääskeläinen
Pekka Jääskeläinen
Ash Bowie

Circle (band) albums
2011 albums